Mayur Vyas (Mayūra Vyāsa) is an Indian voice actor who does dubbing into Hindi for films and television programs. He has done voice over work for numerous characters from American, Tamil and Telugu films and television shows that are dubbed in Hindi.

Personal life
Vyas is a teacher of Management Studies at the Usha Pravin Gandhi College of Management, Mumbai.

Dubbing career
Mayur Vyas has been dubbing Indian and foreign films, TV programs and cartoons into the Hindi language since 2001. His most notable work includes dubbing Rajinikanth's voice from Tamil into Hindi in the films Sivaji, Robot, Lingaa, Kabali, Kaala Karikaalan, 2.0 & Darbar.
Vyas first dubbed for Rajinikanth for Sivaji in 2007. He got the part through Swanand Kirkire who was handling the Hindi screenplay and dubbing for the film.

Vyas has dubbed for Hollywood actors Brad Pitt, Tom Hanks, Hugh Jackman, Robert Downey Jr., Seth Macfarlane and Ben Stiller.

Dubbing roles

Live action series

Animated series

Live action films

Indian films

Hollywood films

Animated films

See also
Dubbing (filmmaking)
List of Indian Dubbing Artists

References

Indian male voice actors
Living people
Male actors from Mumbai
Year of birth missing (living people)